Lullaby to My Father is a 2012 documentary film directed by Amos Gitai that premiered at the Venice Film Festival.

The film relates the story of Gitai's father, Munio Weinraub (1909-1970), an eminent Israeli architect.  Weinraub was a student at the Bauhaus design and architecture school in the city of Dessau when Hitler closed the school in 1933. In May 1933, Weinraub was accused of "treason against the German people", sent to prison and later expelled from Germany. The film traces Munio's route from Poland to Germany, from Switzerland to Palestine.

Gitai has written that his film "is a voyage searching for the relationships between a father and his son, architecture and movies, the history of a journey and intimate memories. Like in my movie Carmel, based on my mother, Efratia's, letters, there is no chronological sequence of events. It is not a reconstituted biography, but a mosaic. The story comes together piece by piece, as a poetical association of pictures, faces, voyages, real architecture and snippets of fiction."

Cast
Jeanne Moreau
Hanna Schygulla
Hanna Maron

References

External links
Official website

2012 films
Israeli documentary films
Films directed by Amos Gitai
Documentary films about architecture
2012 documentary films